Abderrahim Zahiri (born 1 January 1996 in M'rirt) is a Moroccan cyclist, who most recently rode for UCI Continental team .

Major results

2013
 African Junior Road Championships
1st  Road race
2nd  Time trial
 National Junior Road Championships
1st  Road race
1st  Time trial
2014
 1st  Road race, African Youth Games
2015
 3rd Time trial, National Under-23 Road Championships
 4th GP Ben Guerir, Challenge des phosphates
 7th Overall Tour d'Egypte
2016
 3rd  Individual pursuit, African Track Championships
 9th Overall Tour de Côte d'Ivoire
1st Stages 1 & 6 
2017
 National Under-23 Road Championships
1st  Road race
2nd Time trial
 5th Overall Toscana-Terra di Ciclismo
 9th Overall Tour of Ankara
 10th GP Al Massira, Les Challenges de la Marche Verte
2018
 1st Stage 1 Toscana-Terra di Ciclismo
 2nd Trofeo Edil C
 3rd Giro del Medio Brenta
 10th Overall Tour of Mersin
 10th Overall Tour of Estonia
 10th Overall Ronde de l'Isard
2019
 Les Challenges de la Marche Verte
4th GP Sakia El Hamra
8th GP Oued Eddahab
 6th Overall Tour du Cameroun
1st  Young rider classification
 6th Overall Tour du Maroc

References

External links

1996 births
Living people
Moroccan male cyclists